U.S.Avengers is an American comic book series published by Marvel Comics, featuring a traditionally patriotic-themed team of Avengers. It is written by Al Ewing and penciled by Paco Medina. It was released as part of Marvel NOW! 2.0.

Publication history

Al Ewing described this group to be working with S.H.I.E.L.D. while not being a part of it. Besides their leader as the latest Citizen V, the group's other members consist of Robert Maverick (in his Red Hulk form), Squirrel Girl, Cannonball, Pod (under the alias Enigma), Toni Ho's Iron Patriot form, and the time-displaced Danielle Cage's Captain America form who comes from the alternate future of 20XX. The first issue of U.S.Avengers was released on January 4, 2017, and then published in March later that year.

Fictional team history
When Advanced Idea Mechanics merged with the U.S. military to form American Intelligence Mechanics, Sunspot, under the alias of Citizen V, formed the U.S.Avengers with Cannonball, Pod (under the alias of Enigma), Squirrel Girl, and Toni Ho's Iron Patriot form as well as Robert Maverick, who gained a Hulk Plug-In that enables him to turn into a variation of Red Hulk for an hour. Their first mission puts them against the Secret Empire, who were planning to destroy the United States inside their floating volcanic island base. Red Hulk crash-landed into the Secret Empire's floating volcanic island base, hard enough to destroy it. They're later approached by a future version of Danielle Cage as Captain America, who tells them that her nemesis, the Golden Skull, came to their timeline to steal all the wealth. In Miami, Florida, the team crash a charity gala only to discover that the wealthy CEO's were kidnapped and replaced by robots. During the battle, the team manages to defeat and capture the Golden Skull, who was wearing a golden armored suit. Danielle then goes back to her timeline, with the Golden Skull as her prisoner. Red Hulk is later sent to confront and defeat an out-of-control American Kaiju, who was attacking Europe. During the hunt, he encounters Deadpool, who was turned into a monster by a mad scientist named Dr. Vandoom.

During the "Opening Salvo" part of the Secret Empire storyline, Red Hulk stumbles upon the underground lair of Gorilla-Man and his army of Gorilla-Men. Gorilla-Man tries to remove Red Hulk's head in order to strengthen his Gorilla-Men army. Squirrel Girl manages to defeat Gorilla-Man and his army with her flying squirrels. Meanwhile, Steve Rogers has a meeting with Roberto da Costa and scolds him for his recent actions and Cannonball decides to quit the team so he could live with his wife Smasher and their son. Roberto then sees footage of the attacks in Manhattan, deep space, and in Sokovia. Cannonball returns to Earth only to discover the Alpha Flight Space Program, the Guardians of the Galaxy, and the Ultimates' battle against the Chitauri. He joins the heroes in battle until one of the Chitauri Dragons eats Quasar and explodes, leaving both him and Quasar to be presumed dead. When Roberto assembles the team, he is attacked by one of his scientists who has allied with Hydra. Meanwhile, the team arrives in Washington D.C. to confront Hydra when Red Hulk begins to attack them due to nanites that were injected in him, which starts to control him. When Pod and Squirrel Girl end up in Paris and are attacked by Hydra Agents, they are saved by the Champions of Europe consisting of Ares, Captain Britain, Excalibur, Guillotine, Outlaw, and Peregrine. Meanwhile, Cannonball is found by an alien, among the debris from the Chitauri battle, where it's revealed that he's still alive. Red Hulk and Iron Patriot are captured and imprisoned when they see a nearly dead Roberto in one of the cells. While adjusting to prison life, Toni manages to heal Roberto just in time, when Hydra soldiers show up at their cell. Meanwhile, Cannonball is sold at an auction to a human named Howard Mason and Squirrel Girl and Enigma help the Champions of Europe in raiding a Hydra base. At the prison, Roberto manages to use his powers to defeat the guards and free Red Hulk from the nanites controlling him, while Squirrel Girl, Enigma and the Champions of Europe defeat the Hydra soldiers in Paris by destroying a helicarrier and releasing other captured heroes. Cannonball is later brought to an Earth-like American small town named Glenbrook. In the aftermath of the event, Roberto resigns from A.I.M. and is visited by Smasher who tells him that Cannonball is still alive. Meanwhile, Toni deactivates the Hydra nanites in Red Hulk's blood enabling him to return to normal and gets asked by A.I.M. agents to be the organization's new leader and Squirrel Girl and Enigma are seen fighting the Plunderer and Blue Streak who were attempting to rob from the Project P.E.G.A.S.U.S. facility.

While traveling through space, Smasher and the U.S.Avengers are attacked by space pirates known as Warpjackers. After a brief fight, the pirates tell them that Glenbrook is actually a planet named Kral X. Meanwhile, Cannonball is introduced to the townspeople by Ritchie Redwood, ruler of the planet. Upon discovering the people's troublesome behavior, Cannonball tries to escape only to be defeated and captured. Awakening in a dungeon, Cannonball meets other prisoners including a teen named Bugface. In the dungeon, Bugface explains to Cannonball that they're Skrulls and that Kral X is a planet designed for those who are not fit to serve in the Skrull army. In order to make them happy, Kral X was designed to look like a 1950s American TV show, but when the show was cancelled and rebooted in modern times, the Skrull Ritchie neglected Bugface's suggestion to move with the times and sent him and other like-minded citizens to the dungeon to keep their lifestyles the way it is. After escaping the dungeon, Cannonball leads Bugface and the rebels against Ritchie until Smasher and the U.S.Avengers arrive to help. After sending Ritchie and his cohorts to jail, the U.S.Avengers head back home.

Collected editions

References

External links
 U.S.Avengers at Marvel Wiki

Avengers (comics)
United States-themed superheroes